Akhmed Isayevich Malsagov (Russian: Ахмед Исаевич Мальсагов; born on 26th October 1960) a Kazakh-born Russian politician who was a former interim president of the southern Russian republic of Ingushetia. The duration of his term was between December 2001 and May 2002.

Biography

Akhmed Malsagov was born in Salmalkol in Kazakhstan on 26 October 1960.

In 1999, he was the Minister of Economy, and the First Deputy Chairman of the Government of the Republic of Ingushetia. From November 1999 to June 2002, he was the Chairman of the Government of the Republic of Ingushetia. From 28 December 2001 to 23 May 2002, Malsagov served as the Acting President of the Republic of Ingushetia.  

In June 2002, Malsagov voluntarily resigned from the post of Chairman of the Government of the Republic of Ingushetia. 

Since 2002, he has been engaged in entrepreneurial activity and teaches economics at the Ingush State University.

In 2007, he organized the exhibition "Ingushetia through the eyes of artists".

From November 2009 to September 2010, he was the Chairman of the Economic Council under the President of the Republic of Ingushetia, Yunus-bek Yevkurov. Since August 2012, he was a member of the Economic Council. On 11 November 2013, he was appointed Assistant-Advisor to the Head of the Republic of Ingushetia.

From December 2016 to April 2019, he headed the Ingush branch of the Russian Agricultural Bank.

Political activity

He founded the Umka campaign, focused on the production of sausages, meat delicacies and semi-finished products, bakery products and cheese.

Critically assessed the pension reform, suggesting that it could aggravate the existing problems in the North Caucasus.

References 

1960 births
Living people
Russian politicians